Charles Allen Dick (May 24, 1934 – November 8, 2015) was an American Linotype operator who was best known as the widower of Patsy Cline.

Early life 
Dick was born on May 24, 1934 near Whitehall, Virginia.

Patsy Cline 
Dick met Patsy Cline during a dance in Winchester in 1956, and they started dating.  Dick married Patsy Cline in Winchester on September 15, 1957. After their marriage, they moved to Fayetteville, North Carolina where Dick was working as a Linotype operator at Fort Bragg. They moved back to Winchester in 1959 and remained married until 1963 when Cline died in a plane crash.

They had two children together, Julie Sidamore (a misspelling of Simadore) and Allen Randolph (Randy).

Later life 
After Cline's death, even though money wasn't a problem as royalty checks were still coming in,  Dick went back to work, this time as a record promotor for Starday Records, a record label that was based in Nashville, Tennessee. Dick married country singer Jamey Ryan in 1965 and they divorced in 1970, having one child together. He later took part in many documentaries on Patsy Cline.

According to Rolling Stone, "Throughout his life, Dick worked to preserve the legacy of Cline." Wide Open Country called Dick "a lifelong champion of [Cline's] music" and "dedicated to keeping Patsy's legacy alive". The Tennessean referred to Dick as "a champion of her legacy for the last five decades."

After Coal Miner's Daughter came out in 1980, spurring interest in Cline, Dick played a part in having her albums re-released as The Patsy Cline Collection in 1991. In 1997, he worked on the release of Patsy Cline: Live at the Cimarron Ballroom, a recording of a 1961 concert. This recording placed on the Billboard Country Albums Top 40 chart.

Dick died at his home in Nashville on November 8, 2015. He was 81 years old.

He is buried alongside Patsy Cline at Shenandoah Memorial Park in Winchester.

References 

1934 births
2015 deaths
People from King and Queen County, Virginia